KAOI may refer to:

KAOI (AM), a radio station (1110 AM) licensed to Kihei, Hawaii, United States
KAOI-FM, a radio station (95.1 FM) licensed to Wailuku, Hawaii, United States